Audax Club Sportivo Italiano is a Chilean football club based in La Florida. Founded in 1910, it plays in the Campeonato Nacional and has spent most of its history in the top tier of Chilean football. Audax has been national champions four times, joint sixth alongside Magallanes. The club also achieved two Copa Chile runners-up in 1981 and 1988.

The club had their first major success in 1936, when they won the league title. During the 1940s, Audax won two further titles in 1946 and 1948, and a fourth in 1957.

History
The club was founded by Italian residents in Santiago, on November 30, 1910, as Audax Club Ciclista Italiano in the Alberto Caffi's hat store, and was originally focused in cycling. As football developed quickly in Santiago, in 1917 the club begun participating in that sport, and in 1922, when the popularity of football increased within Audax's supporters, the club changed its name to Audax Club Sportivo Italiano.

In January 2007, the club was transformed into a limited liability corporation, and changed its name to Audax Italiano La Florida, adding the name of the comuna in which it's always been located.

The club has always been a regular protagonist in Chilean football, but had never been able to participate in any major international competition until 2007, when they played in the Copa Libertadores. As a club founded by immigrants, it has a special rivalry with the other immigrant clubs Unión Española (founded by Spaniards) and Palestino (founded by Palestinian Arabs).

Honours

Domestic Competitions
Primera División de Chile
Winners (4): 1936, 1946, 1948, 1957
Runner-up (8): 1934, 1935, 1938, 1940, 1944, 1947, 1951, 2006 C
Primera B de Chile
Runner-Up (1): 1995
Copa Chile
Runner-up (2): 1981, 1998
Campeonato de Apertura:
Winners (1): 1941

Performance in CONMEBOL competitions
Copa Libertadores: 2 appearances
2007: Group Stage
2008: Group Stage

Copa Sudamericana: 1 appearance
2007: Second Preliminary Round

Copa CONMEBOL: 1 appearance
1998: First Round

Records
Largest margin of victory:
In Primera División matches: 9–2 vs. Universidad Católica in 1945
In Copa Chile matches: 13–0 vs. Juventud Varsovia in 2010
In international matches: 3–1 Alianza Lima in 2007
Largest margin of defeat:
In Primera División matches: 1–7 vs. Colo-Colo in 1939 & 0–6 vs. Santiago Wanderers in 1993
In international matches: 1–4 vs. Sportivo Luqueño in 2008
Longest win streak: 24 games in 2007
Most goals scored in international play: Rodolfo Moya & Carlos Villanueva (3 goals)
Most goals scored in Primera División: Carlos Tello (101 goals)
Most goals scored in one season in Primera División: José Luis Díaz (23 goals in 1999)
Most goals scored in two short tournaments: Carlos Villanueva (30 goals in 2007)

Players

Current squad

2021 Winter Transfers

In

Out

Managers

 Carlos Giudice (1936)
 José Luis Boffi (1944–45)
 Raúl Estevez (1946)
  Salvador Nocetti (July 1, 1947 – June 30, 1948)
  Ladislao Pakozdi (1951–57)
 Luis Álamos (1967–68)
 Hernán Godoy (1974–77)
  Néstor Isella (1979)
  Vicente Cantatore (1979)
 Hernán Godoy (1980–81)
 Hugo Berly (1983)
 Hernán Godoy (1985)
 Rosauro Parra (1986)
 Hernán Godoy (1988)
 Óscar Meneses (1993–94)
 Jorge Aravena (1995)
 Roberto Hernández (1996–97)
 Oscar Malbernat (1997–99)
 Oscar del Solar (2000–01)
 Hernán Godoy (2001–02)
 Claudio Borghi (Jan 1, 2003 – Dec 31, 2003)
 Roberto Hernández (2003–05)
 Jaime Pizarro (2005)
 Óscar Meneses (2005)
 Raúl Toro (Feb 2, 2006 – Aug 21, 2009)
 Pablo Marini (Jan 1, 2009 – Jan 31, 2010)
  Marcelo Barticciotto (Feb 23, 2010 – May 16, 2010)
 Omar Labruna (May 18, 2010 – June 30, 2012)
 Pablo Marini (July 4, 2012 – June 6, 2013)
 Jorge Luis Ghiso (June 6, 2013 – Oct 20, 2013)

References

External links

Official website

 
Audax
Association football clubs established in 1910
Sport in Santiago
1910 establishments in Chile
Italian association football clubs outside Italy